The name Marni originates from several languages, including Hebrew, meaning "rejoice", and Latin as a variant of "Marina", meaning "of the sea". It also has derivations from Gaelic and Swahili. "Marni" and "Marnie" are the two most common spellings of the female first name, ranking 2,446 and 1,498, respectively, out of 4,275 for females of all ages in the 1990 U.S. Census.

Variants
Due to its many derivations, a number of alternate spellings and related variant names exist, including:
 Marni 
 Marnee
 Marnie
 Marny, a Scandinavian variant of Marina
 Marney
 Marne
 Marna
 Marnette 
 Marnina

People with the given name
 Marnie Baizley (born 1975), Canadian squash player
 Marnie Bassett (1889–1980), Australian historian and biographer
 Darcey Bussell (born Marnie Crittle in 1969), English ballerina
 Marnie Gillett (1953-2004), American arts administrator
 Marnie Hughes-Warrington (born 1970), Australian professor and author
 Marni Jackson, Canadian non-fiction author
 Marnie McBean (born 1968), Canadian rower and triple Olympic champion
 Marnie McGuire (born 1969), former New Zealand professional golfer
 Marni Nixon (1930–2016), Hollywood voice specialist
 Marnie Peters, Canadian wheelchair basketball player
 Marnie Reece-Wilmore (born 1974), Australian actress
 Marnie Schulenburg (1984-2022), American actress
 Marnie Simpson (born 1992), English reality TV star from Geordie Shore
 Marnie Stern (born 1976), American songwriter and guitarist
 Marni Thompson, Canadian actress
 Marnie Weber (born 1959), American artist
 Marnie Woodrow (born 1969), Canadian writer and journalist

People with the surname
 Helen Marnie (born 1978), Scottish musician with the band Ladytron

See also
 Marney, a surname

References